Maria Gonzaga or Maria of Mantua (29 July 1609 – 14 August 1660) was a reigning duchess of Montferrat from 1612 until 1660, and regent in Mantua during the minority of her son from 1637 until 1647.

Biography

Maria was the eldest and only surviving child of Francesco IV Gonzaga, Duke of Mantua and Montferrat and Margaret of Savoy (1589–1655), daughter of Charles Emmanuel I, Duke of Savoy and Infanta Catherine Michelle of Spain.

Maria's father died aged 26 in 1612 when she was only three years old, and was succeeded as Duke of Mantua by his two brothers, who had no issue. This made Maria and her husband Charles of Nevers in 1627 successors to the two Duchies. Maria was already Duchess of Montferrat since 1612. This led to the War of Mantuan Succession.

The outcome was that, after the death of her husband Charles in 1631, his father Charles became the new Duke of Mantua until his death in 1637.

Maria exercised the regency of Mantua on behalf of her son for ten years, until 1647. She died in 1660, aged 51.

Issue
Maria and Charles had:

Maria Gonzaga
Charles Gonzaga (1629–1665) married Archduchess Isabella Clara of Austria
Eleanor Gonzaga (1630–1686), who married in 1651 Ferdinand III, Holy Roman Emperor

See also
House of Gonzaga
Rulers of Mantua
Rulers of Montferrat

References

Sources

External links
 Sardimpex.com : Gonzaga - Marchesi e Duchi sovrani di Mantova, indice L1
 

1609 births
1660 deaths
Maria Gonzaga, Duchess of Montferrat
Regents of Mantua
Duchesses of Mantua
Duchesses of Montferrat
17th-century Italian women
17th-century Italian nobility
17th-century women rulers